This is a list of presidents of Egypt by time in office.  The basis of the list is the difference between dates; if counted by number of calendar days all the figures would be one greater.

Rank by time in office

Notes
This list does not include Sufi Abu Taleb, who served as Acting President for 8 days in 1981 (between the assassination of Anwar Sadat and the inauguration of Hosni Mubarak), Mohamed Hussein Tantawi, who served as a de facto acting President (as head of SCAF) from 11 February 2011 until 30 June 2012 (between the Egyptian revolution of 2011 to 2012 Egyptian presidential election) and Adly Mansour, who served as Acting President from 4 July 2013 to 8 June 2014 (between the 2013 Egyptian coup d'état and the 2014 Egyptian presidential election).

See also
List of presidents of Egypt

Egypt, Presidents
Presidents of Egypt